The 2004–05 Karnataka State Film Awards, presented by Government of Karnataka, to felicitate the best of Kannada Cinema released in the year 2004. The awards were announced on 21 September 2005.

Lifetime achievement award

Jury 
A committee headed by Kodalli Shivaram was appointed to evaluate the feature films awards.

Film Awards

Other Awards

References

Karnataka State Film Awards